Arva, Árva, ARVA or Arvas may refer to:

Current places
 Arva, Ontario, Middlesex Centre, Ontario, Canada
 Arva, Iran, a village in Ardabil Province, Iran
 Arvagh or Arva, County Cavan, Ireland
 Arva River, tributary of the Milcov River in Romania
 Orava (region) (Hungarian Árva), in Slovakia and Poland
 Aladangady or Arva, Karnataka, India
 Arva, village in Valea Călugărească, Prahova, Romania
 Arva, village in Broșteni, Vrancea, Romania

Historical places
 Árva County, Kingdom of Hungary
 Arba (Achaea), ancient Greece

People
 Gábor Árva, Hungarian canoeist
 Serhat Arvas, Turkish action movie filmographer
 Arva, pseudonym for one of The Kransky Sisters

Other
 Arva (moth), a synonym of the moth genus Aroa
 Arvas, Norwegian black metal band
 Avalanche transceiver, beacon or ARVA
 Arva Industries, Canadian heavy machinery company